Sandrine in the Rain is a 2008 thriller film written and directed by Tonino Zangardi and starring Sara Forestier and Adriano Giannini. It premiered at the 2008 Busan International Film Festival.

Plot 
During a shootout with bandits who have just robbed a bank, a police officer inadvertently hits an innocent young woman, Martine, killing her. Destroyed by guilt, Leonardo leaves his post as an agent to move on to an office job and groped to recover his inner balance away from the road. But he knows the charming Sandrine who arrives in her life upsetting her. Sandrine is actually Martine's sister and her goal was to ruin the agent's life to avenge her sister. However Sandrine falls in love with Leonardo and the plan would fail, were it not for Vincent, Sandrine's accomplice.

Cast 
Sara Forestier as  Sandrine
Adriano Giannini as Leonardo
Luca Lionello as  Vincenzo
Goya Toledo as Giuliana
Monica Guerritore as  Carolina
Alessandro Haber as  Conte
 Elsa Mollien as  Martine 
 Gaetano Carotenuto as  Vincent

See also 
 List of Italian films of 2008

References

External links 

2008 thriller films
2008 films
English-language German films
English-language Italian films
Italian thriller films
German thriller films
2000s English-language films
2000s Italian films
2000s German films